Vanderslice is a surname. Notable people with the surname include:

Howard Vanderslice (1853–1929), American businessman
John M. Vanderslice, American soldier
John Vanderslice (born 1967), American musician, songwriter, record producer, and recording engineer